The Foreign Protestants Naturalization Act 1708 (7 Anne c. 5), sometimes referred to as the Foreign and Protestants Naturalization Act 1708, was an Act of the Parliament of Great Britain. The act was passed on 23 March 1709, which was still considered part of the year 1708 in the British calendar of the time. It was passed to allow the naturalisation of French Protestants (Huguenots) who had fled to Britain since the revocation of the Edict of Nantes in 1685. It was one of the British Subjects Acts 1708 to 1772.

The Whig majority in Parliament passed the Act with the support of both Houses of Parliament, despite some opposition concerning a "conflux of aliens that would be invited over". A counter-argument is presented in the preamble of the Act, that "the increase of people is a means of advancing the wealth and strength of a nation".

The effect of the Act was that all foreign Protestants could be naturalised, provided they swore allegiance to the government and received sacrament in any Protestant church. Following passage of the Act, up to 12,000 Palatines, Suabians, and other German Lutherans arrived in Britain between May and June 1709, owing to war in those places. Some German Catholics who arrived were sent back, and some immigrants were sent on to Ireland, New York and Carolina.

The Act was largely repealed by the Tories in 1711 by the Naturalization Act 1711 (10 Anne c. 9). The section dealing with naturalizing the children of British subjects born abroad was, however, not repealed. This section says "3. ... the children of all natural born subjects born out of the ligeance of her Majesty her heires and successors shall be deemed adjudged and taken to be natural born subjects of this kingdom to all intents constructions and purposes whatsoever."

References

External links
Text as originally passed
'Book 1, Ch. 18: Queen Anne', A New History of London: Including Westminster and Southwark (1773), pp. 288–306. Date Retrieved 16 November 2006.

1708 in Christianity
Great Britain Acts of Parliament 1708
British nationality law
Huguenot history in the United Kingdom
Repealed Great Britain Acts of Parliament